Cuthbert Cooper Robinson was an Anglican bishop in the 20th century.

He was born into an ecclesiastical family on 26 May 1893 and educated at the University of Toronto. Ordained after World War I service with the Canadian Army, in 1920  he was engaged in educational work in Japan until 1938. He held incumbencies at  Geraldton, Forest and Noranda. He was Dean of Moosonee from 1948 until 1954 when he became its diocesan bishop, a post he held until his retirement in 1963. He died on 30 May 1971.

References

1893 births
University of Toronto alumni
Anglican archdeacons in North America
Anglican Church of Canada deans
Anglican bishops of Moosonee
20th-century Anglican Church of Canada bishops
1971 deaths